Kerstin Kowalski (also known as Kerstin El Qalqili, born 25 January 1976 in Potsdam-Babelsberg) is a German rower. At the 2000 Olympics she rowed with her twin sister Manja. Kowalski was married to fellow rower Iradj El Qalqili, who had proposed to her at the finish line at the 2000 Olympics.

References

External links
 

1976 births
Living people
German female rowers
Sportspeople from Potsdam
Olympic rowers of Germany
Rowers at the 2000 Summer Olympics
Rowers at the 2004 Summer Olympics
Olympic gold medalists for Germany
Olympic medalists in rowing
World Rowing Championships medalists for Germany
Medalists at the 2004 Summer Olympics
Medalists at the 2000 Summer Olympics
Twin sportspeople